Giurgiulești is a commune in the Cahul District of Moldova.

Geography 
The locality is in the southernmost point of Moldova, at the confluence of the river Prut with the Danube, on the border with Romania and Ukraine. The commune consists of one village, Giurgiulești.

Economy 
The Port of Giurgiulești is the only Moldovan port on the Danube. The building of an oil terminal started there in 1996, and was finished in 2006. As of 2015 there were no facilities in Giurgiulești for travellers or visiting crew members.

The future international airport of the Lower Danube metropolitan area is located just  from Giurgiulești.

Demographics
The commune has a population of 3,074. At the 2014 census, Giurgiulești had a population of 2,866, of which 2,434 (84.9%) are Moldovans, 382 (13.33%) Romanians and 50 (2%) others, including Ukrainian, Gagauz, and Russian people.

At the 1930 census, the village had a population of 1,944, of which 1,914 (98.5%) were Romanians and 30 (1.5%) others (4 Russians, 6 Gagauzians, 8 Bulgarians, 9 Gypsies, 1 Hungarian, and 2 Greeks). At the time, it was part of Plasa Reni of Ismail County.

See also
 Extreme points of Moldova

Gallery

References

 "Giurgiulești, Republica Moldova", in Jurnalul Național, 14 October 2006

External links
 giurgiulesti.atspace.com
 Giurgiulesti International Free Port homepage

Communes of Cahul District
Moldova–Romania border crossings
Extreme points of Moldova
Populated places on the Danube
Populated places on the Prut